Věra Drazdíková (1 February 1933 – 1983) was a Czech gymnast. She competed in seven events at the 1956 Summer Olympics.

References

1933 births
1983 deaths
Czech female artistic gymnasts
Olympic gymnasts of Czechoslovakia
Gymnasts at the 1956 Summer Olympics
Gymnasts from Prague